Vila Nova Futebol Clube, commonly referred to as Vila Nova, is a Brazilian professional club based in Goiânia, Goiás founded on 29 July 1943. It competes in the Campeonato Brasileiro Série B, the second tier of Brazilian football, as well as in the Campeonato Goiano, the top flight of the Goiás state football league.

History
In 1943 the club was founded as Vila Nova Futebol Clube. Three years later, in 1946, the club changed its name to Operário. In 1949 the club changed its name to Araguaia, then in 1950 it was renamed to Fênix Futebol Clube and in 1955 the club changed its name to its current name, Vila Nova Futebol Clube.

In 1961 Vila Nova won their first state championship. In 1977 the team debuted in Campeonato Brasileiro and finished in 55th place. From 1977 to 1980, Vila Nova was state champion in four successive seasons.

In 1996 the club won the Campeonato Brasileiro Third Division without losing a single match. In 1999, Vila Nova competed for the first time in an international competition, the Copa CONMEBOL but was eliminated in the first round, becoming the first Goiás state team to play in an international competition. In 2000, the club won the Campeonato Goiano Second Division after being excluded from the league as a result of forfeiting the final match, and in 2001 and 2005, the club won the Campeonato Goiano. In 2006, it was relegated to the Série C, returning to the Série B in the following year. In 2011, the team was relegated again to the Série C, being promoted to the Campeonato Brasileiro Série B in 2013. However, in 2014, it was relegated in the state championship.

Stadium

Home stadiums are the Onésio Brasileiro Alvarenga stadium (capacity 11,788) and Serra Dourada stadium (capacity 54,048).

Players

Current squad

Out on loan

Supporters
Like all Brazilian football teams, Vila Nova has their own group of die-hard fans who call themselves 'TEV' – Torcida Esquadrão Vilanovense (usually referring to themselves as simply 'Esquadrão'). Many members of TEV come from an area of Goiánia called Zona Leste which is notorious for its crime rate. A popular song sung by TEV at Vila games is:

Vila, Vila, Vila minha vida,
Vila, Vila minha história,
Vila, Vila meu amor!

English translation

Vila, Vila, Vila my life,
Vila, Vila my history,
Vila, Vila my love!

Rivals
Vila Nova's greatest rival is Goiás, with whom there is constant argument about which club has the largest fanbase. A common view is the claim that Vila Nova has the largest fanbase in Goiânia, and Goiás has the largest fanbase in Goiás state. Some Goiás supporters claim their club has also the biggest number of fans in Goiânia. Either way Vila Nova has an estimated fanbase of about 35,000, which is pretty big for a Brazilian second tier club. In the 2011 Série B season, Vila Nova will play Goiás (after Goias were relegated from Série A in 2010) for the first time in the Série B since 1998. They also encounter each other every year during the Campeonato Goiano (state championship). During a game on May 1, 2011 at the Serra Dourada, both teams were involved in a mass brawl on and off the pitch after the Campeonato Goiano semifinal.

Honours
 Campeonato Brasileiro Série C
 Winners (3): 1996, 2015, 2020

Campeonato Goiano
 Winners (15): 1961, 1962, 1963, 1969, 1973, 1977, 1978, 1979, 1980, 1982, 1984, 1993, 1995, 2001, 2005

Copa Goiás
 Winners (3): 1969, 1971, 1976

Campeonato Goiano Second Division
 Winners (2): 2000, 2015

References

External links
Official website

Vila Nova Futebol Clube
Football clubs in Goiás
Association football clubs established in 1943
1943 establishments in Brazil
Campeonato Brasileiro Série C winners